Balthasar de Monconys (1611–1665) was a French traveller, diplomat, physicist and magistrate, who left a diary, which was published by his son as Journal des voyages de Monsieur de Monconys, Conseiller du Roy en ses Conseils d’Estat & Privé, & Lieutenant Criminel au Siège Presidial de Lyon, 2 vols., Lyon, 1665–1666.

Monconys, brought up in Lyon by the Jesuits and a good Catholic, had an interest in the Jesuit missions in infidel territory. He travelled to Portugal, England, Germany, Italy, the Netherlands and the Near East (visiting Baalbek in 1647). Monconys twice paid a visit to Delft to satisfy his curiosity about another hidden church and to meet an artist with a growing reputation. He was the only person, besides Pieter Teding van Berckhout, who met Vermeer, on 11 August 1663, and wrote down an eyewitness account of Vermeer's paintings, during the artist's lifetime. Vermeer had no paintings to show him and Monconys and his companion, a clergyman from The Hague, were directed to the local baker Hendrick van Buyten, who possessed one of the artist's paintings. Monconys also visited Johannes Sibertus Kuffler in the same year.

Works

References

1611 births
1665 deaths
17th-century French diplomats
17th-century French physicians